Robert Lawrence Carter Jr. (born April 4, 1994) is an American professional basketball player for Bnei Herzliya of the Israeli Basketball Premier League. Born in Thomasville, Georgia, he played basketball for the high school of his hometown as well as Shiloh High School in Snellville, Georgia. Carter played collegiately for Georgia Tech and Maryland.

College career
In June 2014, after two seasons with the Yellow Jackets, Carter Jr. transferred to Maryland. As a red-shirt junior, he was all-Big Ten honorable mention by both the coaches and media. He posted 12.3 points and 6.9 rebounds per game and shot 55 percent from the field and 33 percent from behind the arc. After ensuring his graduation from college, Carter declared for the 2016 NBA draft and signed an agent, losing his final year of college eligibility.

Professional career
Carter went undrafted in the 2016 NBA Draft. Carter played for the 2016 Golden State Warriors' Summer League team. On July 30, 2016, Carter signed with Enel Brindisi of Italy's Serie A. He averaged 13 points and 6.6 rebounds per game while shooting 52.5 percent from the floor and 35.5 percent on 3-pointers. This earned him another Summer League invite, this time with the Denver Nuggets.

Before the 2017–18 season, Carter joined the Lithuanian club Lietuvos rytas Vilnius. The player left the club by mutual consent on December 5, 2017. Turkish Super League side Gaziantep Basketbol announced that the American signed for them on the same day. Carter opted out of a deal with Gaziantep to sign with the Zhejiang Golden Bulls of the Chinese Basketball Association on August 13, 2018. However, he never played for Zhejiang.

On December 23, 2018, he signed with Afyon Belediye of the Basketbol Süper Ligi. 

Carter spent the 2019–20 season with the Shimane Susanoo Magic, in Japan, averaging 21 points and 10 rebounds per game. On September 19, 2020, he signed with the Yokohama B-Corsairs.

On June 20, 2021, he signed with San-en NeoPhoenix of the B.League.

On August 10, 2022, he signed with Bnei Herzliya of the Israeli Basketball Premier League.

References

External links
 Robert Carter Jr. at Sports Reference
Maryland Terrapins bio
Georgia Tech Yellow Jackets bio

1994 births
Living people
Afyonkarahisar Belediyespor players
American men's basketball players
American expatriate basketball people in Italy
American expatriate basketball people in Lithuania
American expatriate basketball people in Turkey
Basketball players from Georgia (U.S. state)
BC Rytas players
Bnei Hertzeliya basketball players
Gaziantep Basketbol players
Georgia Tech Yellow Jackets men's basketball players
Lega Basket Serie A players
Maryland Terrapins men's basketball players
New Basket Brindisi players
People from Thomasville, Georgia
Power forwards (basketball)
Shimane Susanoo Magic players